In the early morning of 28 September 2021, an explosion took place in an apartment building containing 140 apartments, in Annedal, Gothenburg, Sweden. 

Twenty-five people were taken to hospital, four of them with serious injuries. One person died of her injuries, two weeks after the explosion.

A man in his 50s, who lived in the building, was suspected of having caused the explosion, and he was remanded in his absence. On 6 October, he was found dead in the Göta älv river. As of December 2021, the police investigation is still ongoing.

References

2020s in Gothenburg
2021 crimes in Sweden
September 2021 crimes in Europe
2021 murders in Sweden